John David Morris (born 1946) was an American young earth creationist. He was the son of "the father of creation science", Henry M. Morris, and served as president of the Institute for Creation Research (ICR) from the time of his father's death until 2020. Morris was a creationist author and spoke at a variety of churches. Many of his presentations discussed the fossil record and its relation to evolution.

Biography
Morris has a B.S. in Civil Engineering from Virginia Tech (1969), an M.S., University of Oklahoma (1977), and a PhD, University of Oklahoma (1980) in Geological Engineering. In 1984 he joined the Institute for Creation Research and in 1996 he became its president.

Criticism
Critics have disputed Morris's claims. For instance, the following statement by Morris:

... elicited the following response from Jim Foley in TalkOrigins Archive:

Books

See also
 Creation–evolution controversy
 Lucy (Australopithecus)
 Australopithecines

References

External links
Critical of Morris
 Answers In Creation Old earth creationist reviews of the claims of John Morris

1946 births
Living people
Baptists from the United States
Christian writers
American Christian Young Earth creationists
Leaders of Christian parachurch organizations
University of Oklahoma alumni
University of Oklahoma faculty
Creation scientists